Hiram Emory Widener Jr. (April 20, 1923 – September 19, 2007) was a United States circuit judge of the United States Court of Appeals for the Fourth Circuit.

Early life and career

Born on April 20, 1923, in Abingdon, Virginia, Widener received a Bachelor of Science degree from the United States Naval Academy in 1944 and then served in the United States Navy until 1949. In 1953 he received a Bachelor of Laws from Washington and Lee University School of Law. He was a Lieutenant in the United States Naval Reserve from 1951 to 1952, and was in private practice in Bristol, Virginia from 1953 to 1969. He was a Commissioner for the United States District Court for the Western District of Virginia from 1963 to 1966, and was a member of the Virginia Election Laws Study Commission from 1968 to 1969.

Federal judicial service

Widener was nominated by President Richard Nixon on June 19, 1969, to the United States District Court for the Western District of Virginia, to a new seat authorized by 71 Stat. 586. He was confirmed by the United States Senate on July 11, 1969, and received his commission on July 14, 1969. He served as Chief Judge from 1971 to 1972. His service terminated on October 27, 1972, due to his elevation to the Fourth Circuit.

Widener was nominated by President Nixon on September 25, 1972, to a seat on the United States Court of Appeals for the Fourth Circuit vacated by Judge Albert Vickers Bryan. He was confirmed by the Senate on October 12, 1972, and received commission on October 17, 1972. He assumed senior status on July 17, 2007. He was the last federal appeals court judge in active service to have been appointed by President Nixon. His service terminated on September 19, 2007, due to his death.

Succession controversy

Widener announced his intent to take senior status upon confirmation of his successor in 2001. William J. Haynes II had been nominated to succeed Widener but was never given a vote in the Senate. In January 2007, Haynes withdrew his candidacy for nomination to replace Widener on the Fourth Circuit. He had long been opposed by Democrats and a few Republicans, and with the Democrats having regained control of the Senate, his chances for confirmation appeared to have completely vanished. On July 17, 2007, Widener took senior status unconditionally.

Death

Widener died at his home outside Abingdon on September 19, 2007, after a year-long battle with lung cancer.

References

Sources
 
 Washington Post obituary

1923 births
2007 deaths
People from Abingdon, Virginia
Deaths from lung cancer
Deaths from cancer in Virginia
Virginia lawyers
United States Navy officers
United States Navy personnel of World War II
United States Naval Academy alumni
Judges of the United States District Court for the Western District of Virginia
United States district court judges appointed by Richard Nixon
Judges of the United States Court of Appeals for the Fourth Circuit
United States court of appeals judges appointed by Richard Nixon
20th-century American judges
Washington and Lee University School of Law alumni
Washington and Lee University School of Law faculty